Rhosgoch (meaning: Red Moor) is a small village in the north of the island of Anglesey, Wales, about  to the south-west of Amlwch. It is in the community of Rhosybol.

A short distance to the west of the village is the small lake Llyn Hafodol and a mile to the south is Anglesey's largest body of water the reservoir Llyn Alaw (Water Lily Lake).

The village once had a station on the Anglesey Central Railway. Although the tracks still exist, no train has run on them since 1993. Also connected to the railway, was a short south-west facing spur that led to an oil terminal. This was linked to a floating dock in the sea off of Amlwch, where super-tankers could dock in all tides and feed oil via Rhosgoch and a pipeline to Stanlow oil refinery. This operation lasted for 16 years between 1974 and 1990.

The first tornado of the record-breaking 1981 United Kingdom tornado outbreak, an F1/T2 tornado, touched down close to Rhosgoch at around 10:19 local time on 23 November 1981.

References

External links 

Photos of Rhosgoch and surrounding area on geograph.org.uk

Villages in Anglesey
Rhosybol